Clive is a civil parish in Shropshire, England.  It contains 14 listed buildings that are recorded in the National Heritage List for England.  Of these, one is listed at Grade II*, the middle of the three grades, and the others are at Grade II, the lowest grade.  The parish contains the village of Clive and the surrounding countryside.  The listed buildings consist of a church with a memorial in the churchyard, houses, cottages and farmhouses with associated structures, and a boundary stone.


Key

Buildings

References

Citations

Sources

Lists of buildings and structures in Shropshire